Jabrun-du-Sud is a settlement in Guadeloupe, on the island of Grande-Terre. Quatre Chemins and Boisripeau are to its west, and Jabrun is to the east.

Populated places in Guadeloupe